is a Nippon Professional Baseball player for the Yomiuri Giants in Japan's Central League.

External links

Profile and stats 

1983 births
Japanese baseball players
Living people
Nippon Professional Baseball pitchers
Sportspeople from Amagasaki
Baseball people from Hyōgo Prefecture
Yomiuri Giants players